Ivo Ulich (born 9 September 1974) is a Czech former professional footballer who played as a midfielder.

Club career 
Ulich played for Slavia Prague, Borussia Mönchengladbach, Vissel Kobe and Dynamo Dresden. He retired from football in 2008, but stayed with Dynamo Dresden as a scout.

Ulich spent most of his Gambrinus liga career at Slavia Prague. In 1995, as a player of SK Hradec Králové, he won the Talent of the Year award at the Czech Footballer of the Year awards.

He plays futsal for Slavia.

International career 
Ulich played internationally for the Czech Republic.

Career statistics

Honours 
 Czech Cup: 1995, 1997, 1999
 Confederations Cup: third place 1997

References

External links 
 
 

1974 births
Living people
People from Opočno
Sportspeople from the Hradec Králové Region
Czech footballers
Association football midfielders
Czech Republic under-21 international footballers
Czech Republic international footballers
FC Hradec Králové players
SK Slavia Prague players
Borussia Mönchengladbach players
Vissel Kobe players
Dynamo Dresden players
1997 FIFA Confederations Cup players
Czech First League players
Bundesliga players
J1 League players
Dynamo Dresden non-playing staff
FK Náchod-Deštné players
Czech expatriate footballers
Czech expatriate sportspeople in Germany
Expatriate footballers in Germany
Czech expatriate sportspeople in Japan
Expatriate footballers in Japan